Robert Van Eenaeme (1916–1959) was a Belgian cyclist.

1916 births
1959 deaths
Belgian male cyclists
Cyclists from East Flanders
Sportspeople from Ghent